In corporate finance, the swap ratio is an exchange rate of the shares of the companies that undergo a merger; 

The swap ratio determines the control that each group of shareholders of the companies shall have over the combined firm: essentially a function of the relative value of the strategic and financial results of the two companies. This ratio is thus calculated as a function of the valuation of the various assets and liabilities of the merging companies.

See also
 Risk arbitrage
 Stock swap
 Junk bonds
 Accretion (finance)
 Contingent value rights

References

Corporate finance
Mergers and acquisitions